Jamaican dancehall recording artist Spice has released two studio albums, one extended play, one mixtape, ninety-seven singles (including twelve as a featured artist) and seventy-six music videos (including ten as a featured artist).

In July 2009, Spice signed a recording contract with VP Records. Her debut extended play So Mi Like It was released on 2 December 2014, and debuted at number 14 on Billboard's Top Reggae Albums. The EP spawned the singles "So Mi Like It" and "Conjugal Visit" featuring Vybz Kartel.

Following a legal dispute with her record label, Spice independently released her first full-length release, a mixtape titled Captured, on 2 November 2018. The mixtape debuted at number one on the Billboard Reggae Albums chart and included the single "Black Hypocrisy". Her debut studio album, 10, was released in 2021 and spawned the single "Go Down Deh" featuring Shaggy and Sean Paul.

Studio albums

Extended plays

Mixtapes

Singles

As lead artist

As featured artist

Other charted songs

Guest appearances

Music videos

As lead artist

As featured artist

Notes

References

External links
 
 
 
 

Discographies of Jamaican artists
Reggae discographies